The Wedding Game is a 2009 romantic comedy film directed by Ekachai Uekrongtham, co-produced by MediaCorp Raintree Pictures (Singapore), Scorpio East Pictures (Singapore), Double Vision (Malaysia) and Speedy Productions (Malaysia) starring real life couple Fann Wong and Christopher Lee.The film centers on actors Jack Fang (Christopher) and Vikki Tse (Fann) who orchestrate a faux engagement to boost their showbiz careers.

Plot
Jack Fang (Christopher Lee) publicly proposes to Vikki Tse (Fann Wong) during the live telecast of a regional awards show. Surprised but happy, Vikki accepts. What the public doesn't know is that the entire love affair of these two famous celebrities, Jack and Vikki, is an elaborate and meticulously planned ruse designed by their ambitious managers, May (Alice Lau) and Tom (Blackie Chen), to trick the public into believing that they are getting married. In reality, Jack has disliked Vikki from the first day they met and vice versa. Yet for fame and money from endorsements, these rival celebrities keep up with their “fake” marriage to increase their popularity.  Just when everything starts going well, an incident rattles some of the fans and the media. There is now lingering doubt about the authenticity of this love match. They fall in love.

Production
The film was written by Dennis Chew, Desmond Sim and Ekachai Uekrongtham,  and directed by Ekachai Uekrongtham, and was shot in Singapore and Malaysia, Malacca. The working title for the film was originally The Wedding of the Year, but was officially changed to The Wedding Game.

The Wedding Game marks Singapore Sports Council and production company Raintree Pictures' first silver screen collaboration. As this is the first time Team Singapore athletes are featured in a movie

Filming took less than a month and occurred in late 2008.

Main cast

Co-Starring
 Daniel Tan 陈家风
 Lai Meng 黎明
 Saiful Apek
 Chin Chi Kang 钱自刚

Special Appearance by Team Singapore
 Jazreel Tan
 Jing Jun Hong
 Kendrick Lee
 Tao Li

Music
Besides having local rising talent Hagen Tan collaborating with veteran musician Dr Ng King Kang for the production, soundtrack producer and music arranger are filled in by local talent too.

Original Soundtrack
 1. 我们的爱 (Hagen Tan 陈孟奇 & Christy Yow 姚惠敏)
 2. 双喜 (Hagen Tan 陈孟奇)
 3. 习惯 (吴庆康 & 陈丽伊　Katherine Tan)
 4. 爱反复 (Hagen Tan 陈孟奇)
 5. 爱反复 (吉他伴奏版)
 6. 我们的爱 (钢琴伴奏版)
 7. 我舍不得 (Hagen Tan 陈孟奇 Demo 版)

Release
Mediacorp Raintree Pictures held the Singapore premiere of The Wedding Game on January 23, 2009 at the Golden Village Cinemas in both Great World City and VivoCity at 7.30pm and 9.00pm respectively. 
Its Malaysia premiere was held on January 22, 2009 at The Pavilion.
Island-wide screening in Singapore will commence on January 25, 2009.

Box office performance
The Wedding Game has raked in S$1.25 million at the Singapore box office since it opened in Singapore on January 25 despite strong competition from other titles. It has also done well in Malaysia collecting an impressive RM$2 million as of February 1.

Critical reception
Rating of this movie was publicly discussed as The Wedding Game were argued to be too erotic or obscene and are unsuitable for the young  were rated as PG (Parental-Guidance) while its main local competitor Love Matters were rated NC-16 by the censorship board.

References

External links
 
 
 Golden Village
 Fannatic Fann Club
 

2009 films
2009 romantic comedy films
2000s Mandarin-language films
Singaporean romantic comedy films